The Wojtek Memorial Trust is a Scottish Charity (SCO41057) established in 2009 to celebrate the life of Wojtek, "the Soldier Bear", the lives of those who knew him, and their stories during and after the Second World War.  The Trust also aims to promote wider understanding of the many historic and current links between the peoples of Poland and Scotland.

Wojtek Statue in Edinburgh

The Trust has commissioned a memorial to honour Wojtek, and remember the courage of all Polish soldiers.  It will be located in Princes Street Garden in Edinburgh, Scotland.  Planning permission was received from the City of Edinburgh Council on 16 September 2013 (13/02699/FUL).
The memorial will take the form of a life and a quarter bronze statue of a Polish soldier with Wojtek, and a 4m low relief pictorial panel to be set on a granite platform.  The ambition is to source the granite from Poland so that the soldier and the bear can stand on a piece of Polish homeland.  The sculptor is Alan Beattie Herriot  and the caster Powderhall Bronze  in Edinburgh. Its setting has been designed by Raymond Muszynski of Morris & Steedman Associates.

The statue will be located on the terrace walk at the west end of Princes Street Gardens, on the south side of the main terrace at the corner of a pathway leading down into the main area of the gardens. The figures are standing, waiting to engage with the passers by.  This is an important part of the story for this most sociable bear and his keeper. Wide stone steps will provide a welcome seating point from which to view the gardens.  The  pictorial panel animates the story and provides a sensitive new feature in the gardens.  It will also be cast in bronze. Planting behind the panel of beech and hawthorn will reflect the flora of the country lanes in Berwickshire, where Wojtek lived at Winfield Camp.. Hawthorn is the symbol of love and beech is the symbol of prosperity and friendship

The artistry of the sculpture will be appreciated from Princes Street looking down into the gardens; at the terrace level as a walking encounter with the bear and his keeper; and looking up from the lower path to see the statue in a natural elevation.  Furthermore, the aspect to the castle will be reminiscent of that which faced the soldiers at the final Battle of Monte Cassino  in May 1944 as they fought their way up the slopes assisted by Wojtek.

Wojtek Memorial Trust Tartan

To commemorate Wojtek's story, and the links between Poland and Scotland in another form, the Wojtek Memorial Trust have designed an official tartan, with the help of Kinloch Anderson Ltd.  The Wojtek Memorial Trust Tartan  is based on the Roxburgh sett because Wojtek visited Springwood Park, Kelso owned by the Duke of Roxburgh when he arrived in Scotland. The vibrant red colour of the tartan reflects the Polish flag whilst the red “ribbon-like lines” are a reminder of the red and white ribbons soldiers bought from local women in Persia to sew onto their uniforms to identify themselves as the Polish Army. The colours of the Polish flag and the Scottish flag sit together in the design to represent the special relationship between Poland and Scotland. The two shades of green reflect the countryside of the Scottish Borders and the Leslie tartan trews which were worn by the King’s Own Scottish Borderers Regiment. The single sand over-check is a reminder of the desert lands of the Middle East and of Wojtek’s soft brown fur. Within the tartan design it is symbolically placed in the heart of the Scottish Borders green, representing where both the Polish soldiers and Wojtek found friendship and a new homeland.

References 

2009 establishments in Scotland
Charities based in Edinburgh
Organizations established in 2009